Ardeluța River may refer to:

 Ardeluța, a tributary of the Solca in Suceava County, Romania
 Ardeluța, a tributary of the Tarcău in Neamț County, Romania

See also 
 Ardeluța, a village in Tarcău Commune, Neamț County, Romania